Clypeosectus delectus is a species of sea snail, a marine gastropod mollusk in the family Lepetodrilidae.

Description

Distribution
This marine species is found in the Pacific Ocean at thermal vents, Galapagos Rift

References

 Warén, A. & Bouchet, P. (2001) Gastropoda and Monoplacophora from hydrothermal vents and seeps; new taxa and records. The Veliger, 44, 116–231

External links

Lepetodrilidae
Gastropods described in 1989